USS John Hancock may refer to:

 was a steamship first commissioned in 1850. She was sold in 1865.

See also

United States Navy ship names